Cymopterus gilmanii is a species of flowering plant in the carrot family known by the common name Gilman's springparsley.

This plant is native to the US states of California and Nevada, where it is an uncommon inhabitant of the scrublands on the limestone and gypsum slopes of the Mojave Desert mountains.

Description
Cymopterus gilmanii has a short, fibrous stem from which it bears flat, thick, blue-green parsley-shaped leaves, each leaflet subdivided into pointed triangular segments.

The inflorescence is a spread umbel atop a tall peduncle, with white and purple flowers at the ends of pedicels.

External links

Jepson Manual Treatment
USDA Plants Profile
UC CalPhotos gallery

gilmanii
Flora of the California desert regions
Flora of Nevada
Natural history of the Mojave Desert
Endemic flora of the United States